Population Foundation of India is a national non-profit organisation (NGO), which promotes and advocates for the effective formulation and implementation of gender sensitive population, health and development strategies and policies.

History
The organisation was founded in 1970 by a group of  industrialists under the leadership of the late JRD Tata and Dr Bharat Ram.

References

External links

Non-profit organisations based in India
Organizations established in 1970
1970 establishments in Delhi